Jason Daniel Earles (born April 26, 1977) is an American actor. He is known for his role as Jackson Stewart in the Disney Channel sitcom Hannah Montana and his role as Rudy Gillespie in the Disney XD series Kickin' It.

Early life
Earles was born in San Diego, California. After living in Ohio and Washington state, his family moved to Oregon. In Oregon, he graduated from Glencoe High School in Hillsboro. Before moving back to southern California, Earles lived in Billings, Montana, where he graduated in theatre arts from Rocky Mountain College in 2000.

Career
Earles played a nerdy card gamer who was friends with the character Brian Miller in the CBS sitcom Still Standing. In 2004, he appeared in the film National Treasure as Thomas Gates, ancestor of Ben Gates (Nicolas Cage). In 2005, Earles played Ernie Kaplowitz in the film American Pie Presents: Band Camp.

Earles' most notable role was as Jackson Stewart, the older brother of Miley Stewart (Miley Cyrus), in the Disney Channel series Hannah Montana from 2006 to 2011. Earles was notably older than the character he played; when the show began, he was a 29-year-old playing a 16-year-old.

He guest-starred twice in the Disney Channel series Phil of the Future as Grady Spaggett, an advanced math student. Earles appeared in the 2006 Disney Channel Games on the Blue Team, and in the 2007 and 2008 Disney Channel Games on the Red team.

Earles was the co-host of Disney Channel's Sing-Along Bowl-athon (Disney Channel's 2006 New Year's Eve special) and the corresponding online voting.

He voiced Spudnik in the 2009 talking dog film Space Buddies. Earles stars as the sensei, Rudy Gillespie in the Disney XD original series Kickin' It, which premiered on June 13, 2011.

Earles served as the acting coach for High School Musical: The Musical: The Series, and will guest star in season three as Dewey Wood, a camp counselor.

Personal life and philanthropy
Earles has contributed cast memorabilia to the fundraisers for Rocky Mountain College, his alma mater.

He was married to Jennifer Earles from 2002 to 2013. On August 12, 2017, Jason Earles married Katie Drysen.

Filmography

Awards and nominations

References

External links
 
 Jason Earles audio interview at Tommy2.Net

1977 births
21st-century American male actors
American male film actors
American male television actors
Living people
Male actors from Oregon
Male actors from San Diego
People from Hillsboro, Oregon
Rocky Mountain College alumni